H. M. Cassime (born Mohamed Cassime also spelt as Mouhamad Cassime, H. M. Kassim) (1900–1986) was a Tamil-born businessman and mayor of Pondicherry. He served as mayor from 15 September 1956 to 3 November 1961 during the period of the merger of Pondicherry from French India to the Republic of India.

Personal life
H.M.Cassime was born to Mouhamad Haniff also spelt as (Mohamed Haniff) and Mouhamadmoidinebiby. H.M.Cassime's father Mohamed Haniff was himself a Chevalier dans l'Ordre de la Legion d'Honneur and Deputy Mayor of Pondicherry during the French Regime. H.M.Cassime's eldest son, C.M.Achraff, born C. Mohamed Acharaff, was a Member of the Legislative Assembly of Pondicherry winning 7 times in the Assembly Elections of Pondicherry from 1964 till his death in 1999. C.M.Achraff was also a Deputy mayor and a Minister of the Legislative Assembly of Pondicherry during his lifetime. C.M.Acharaff is one of the 155 Persons from Puducherry who were awarded Tamra Patras.

Political life
H.M.Cassime was a businessman who also took active part in politics during the French and Indian periods. He was one of the 14 important Politicians of French Pondicherry who openly sent Telegrams to the French Government emphasising the importance of ceding and stressing to cede Pondicherry and the French Settlements in India to the Indian Union as the right and logical choice owing to the Racial, Geographical, Historical, Economical and Cultural contacts and similarities that Pondicherry has with the rest of Indian Union. The 14 Politicians were H.M.Cassime, Karunendhra Mudaliar, Balasubramanian, Deivasigamany, Ratnasababathy, Thanaraja, Emmanuel Tetta, Sinnatha Mudaliar, Arockianadin, Venkatasamy Reddiar, Ratnam Chettiar, Lakshminarayana Reddiar, Venkatabubba Reddiar and Thiyagaraja Nayakar. This gave impetus to the Freedom Movement of Pondicherry. He was one of the 178 signatories of the Khizhoor Referendum held in 1954 which led to the Cession of Pondicherry to India from the French. He was the Mayor of Pondicherry for periods before and after the De Facto transfer of Pondicherry. From 1966 until his death in 1986 he was the President of the Chambre de Commerce - Chamber of Commerce of Pondicherry.

Posts held
26 June 1946 to 27 October 1948 - Deputy Mayor
27 October 1948 to 30 March 1954 - Deputy Mayor
30 March 1954 to 22 October 1954 - Mayor
22 October 1954 to 18 November 1954 - President of the Municipal Committee
19 November 1954 to 10 August 1955  - Vice President of the Municipal Committee
10 August 1955 to 15 September 1956 - Deputy Mayor
15 September 1956 to 3 November 1961 - Mayor

Accolades
H.M.Cassime was honored by the French Government with the Ordre du Nichan el Anouar and Ordre de l'Étoile d'Anjouan (France). He was awarded Knighthood (Chevalier) in both these categories. These Two colonial Orders were replaced by L'Ordre national du Merite -  National Order of Merit (France) in 1963 by President Charles de Gaulle. In recognition of his services to Pondicherry, the Street Ambour Salai (Quai d'Ambour) was renamed to H. M. Cassime Salai and also the small market in Pondicherry was renamed to Janab H. M. Kassim Angadi

References

Knights of the Ordre national du Mérite
French India
20th century in Pondicherry
20th-century Indian politicians
20th-century Indian businesspeople
1900 births
1986 deaths